Pasford may refer to:

Pasford, Staffordshire on List of United Kingdom locations: Par-Pay
John Pasford (fl. 1371–1394), English politician and member of Parliament